Auckland, New Zealand's largest city, is considering introducing light rail lines to replace some of its most heavily used bus routes. Many of these new light rail lines, if built, would reuse the routes of Auckland's former tram system. Light rail systems have been proposed in Auckland throughout the late-20th and 21st centuries following the closure of the tram system in the 1950s.

In 2015, the city's transport agency Auckland Transport proposed a new light rail network - with a focus on a line between the Auckland CBD and Auckland Airport. In subsequent years, various technology types and modes have been proposed by local and central government - including traditional street tramways and light metro. The most recent form of the project, proposed by the Sixth Labour Government of New Zealand, would see the construction of a hybrid underground/surface route.

History

Background

Auckland was served by a network of traditional tramcar routes with horse-drawn trams (1884–1902) and electric trams (1902–1956).

Initial proposals
In 2015, Steve Hawkins, Auckland Transport's Chief Engineer, said that the bus routes on Symonds Street and Fanshawe Street require as many as 150 buses each.  The light rail study is considering replacing the bus routes on Dominion Road, Manukau Road, Mt Eden Road, Symonds Street and Queen St with light rail routes.  All of these bus routes replaced routes on Auckland's former tram network.

Stuff quoted Auckland Transport officials who described how the study was considering the option of building light rail routes with dedicated right of way versus routes where rail vehicles shared the road with other vehicles, as with a traditional streetcar system. Officials projected that the maximum passenger capacity of a segregated light rail line would be 18,000 passengers per hour, while that of a street-running system would be 12,000 passengers per hour. This compares with a bus on a shared path shifting 2,500 people and a bus on a priority path's 6,000 people an hour.

In 2015, then Auckland Mayor Len Brown pointed out that the city's ten-year plan did not include funding for building new light rail routes.

A line from the airport east to Botany Downs has also been proposed with a new interchange at Puhinui railway station, planned to be built in two stages, the first of which is said to be an early deliverable component of the Airport to Botany rapid transit line, planned to be operational by the end of 2020/early 2021. This encompasses a new at-grade bus/rail interchange and enhanced station. Buses will still use the existing local road (Bridge Street) to cross the railway line to/from Manukau, along with local traffic. The second phase provides a rapid transit overbridge across the railway line to provide a more direct and bespoke rapid transit connection. The new rapid transit link will integrate with the new interchange station on the overbridge. The first stage is estimated to cost $59 million to construct. The line will also go through Manukau railway station before ending in Botany.

On 26 April 2018, Mayor Phil Goff and Transport Minister Phil Twyford announced the Auckland Transport Alignment Project 2018 with $NZ28 billion of investment in Auckland transport infrastructure over ten years, including the fast-tracking of light rail to Auckland International Airport.

On 9 May 2018, in a pre-Budget announcement, Twyford and Finance Minister Grant Robertson made the surprise announcement that work on two routes would commence immediately, with an open-tender process for funding, construction, and operation of the lines:
 A line from Wynyard Quarter along Queen Street with one route to Auckland Airport via Dominion Road.
 A second line, also travelling along Queen Street, then via Karangahape Road and Great North Road to Westgate via a Northwestern Motorway dedicated light-rail corridor, with extensions indicated to Kumeu and Huapai, running past the currently disused Kumeu and Huapai railway stations on the North Auckland Line. Passenger services on the Western Line do not currently operate north of Swanson and do not serve these stations.

In May 2018, it was announced that the New Zealand Superannuation Fund had expressed an interest in financing, designing, building and operating Auckland's light rail network, in a consortium with CDPQ Infra, a Canadian infrastructure company. The consortium was named NZ Infra.

By early 2019, the cost of the two lines had been estimated at $6 billion, with an underground alignment through Queen St under consideration.

In August 2019, Mayor Phil Goff announced that work on the light rail network might begin the following year. The same month, two delivery partners for the project were shortlisted; NZ Infra and NZ Transport Agency, but it was stated that a 2020 start date would be unlikely. By late 2019, two different types of technology were being considered by the New Zealand Ministry of Transport. The original proposal from the New Zealand Transport Agency consisted of surface level light rail; the other from NZ Super Fund explored fully grade-separated, driverless light metro technology, with an underground alignment through Queen St and elevated sections elsewhere, with fewer stations between the city centre and airport.

In May 2020, it was reported that the light rail project had been placed on hold due to the impact of the COVID-19 pandemic in New Zealand. In June, Twyford confirmed that the Ministry of Transport was still committed to the project, but as a fully grade-separated light metro line between the city and airport; stating that "Our policy is that light metro is the form of rapid transit that Auckland needs. We've decided very clearly that we need a rapid transit system that's not competing with pedestrians and other cars in the road corridor. A light metro system just like you see in London, New York, Tokyo, Paris, is actually faster and more efficient. It would allow you to get from Queen St to the Airport in 30 minutes as opposed to the 47 minutes that was projected for the old streetcar model Auckland Transport developed." The ministry did not release the updated cost of the new light metro proposal, or any time frame for its construction. However industry commentators have estimated the decision to use the metro mode will increase cost of the two lines from $6 billion to more than $20 billion, with a new design and construction period of 8 to 10 years beginning from 2021 at the earliest.

Final proposal
In January 2022, the New Zealand government confirmed it had endorsed a $14.6 billion "Tunnelled Light Rail" line from the city centre to the airport, featuring an underground line between the city centre and Mount Roskill, which would then emerge to the surface and continue to the airport via Māngere. Minister for Transport Michael Wood indicated construction could begin in 2023 and last six to seven years.

Route
The City Centre-Māngere line is, as of 2022, proposed to run from Wynyard Quarter to Auckland Airport; via the Auckland CBD, University of Auckland, Kingsland railway station, Wesley, Mount Roskill, Onehunga and Māngere. There would be a total of 18 stops with trains running every five minutes. While the line between Wynyard Quarter and Mount Roskill would be tunnelled, the rest of the network would be a surface line running alongside State Highway 20.

See also
 Rail transport in New Zealand
 Trams in New Zealand
 Auckland Airport Line
 Public transport in Auckland
 Light rail in Wellington

References

External links

 
Proposed rail infrastructure in New Zealand
Light rail in New Zealand